In fashion, falsies are paddings for use in a bra to create the appearance of larger breasts. The term has also, more rarely, been used for pads which create the appearance of larger buttocks. In both cases, there is a note of (more or less) amusement conveyed by the term. In a specifically humorous context, the term refers to moulded plastic replicas of female breasts that may be worn (covered or uncovered) by males for comedic effect. Falsies are typically held onto the chest by elastic straps or forming the top part of an apron.
More recently, the term is also a short for false lashes.

See also
Brassiere
Padding
Cleavage enhancement

Lingerie
Breast

Women's clothing